Moirlanich Longhouse is a rare example of a cruck frame Scottish cottage. It is owned by the National Trust for Scotland and is open to visitors from May to September.

Removal of the corrugated roof during a recent renovation revealed the remains of the original thatched roof and analysis of this has added significantly to knowledge of thatching in Scotland.

References

External links 
 Entry on NTS website

Architecture in Scotland
National Trust for Scotland properties
Historic house museums in Stirling (council area)
Houses in Stirling (council area)